Baron St Oswald, of Nostell in the West Riding of the County of York, is a title in the Peerage of the United Kingdom. It was created in 1885 for the industrialist and Conservative politician Rowland Winn, a former Member of Parliament for North Lincolnshire. His son, the second Baron, represented Pontefract in the House of Commons. His grandson, the fourth Baron, held junior ministerial positions in the Conservative administrations of Harold Macmillan and Alec Douglas-Home and also sat as a Member of the European Parliament.  the title is held by the latter's nephew, the sixth Baron, who succeeded his father in 1999.

The family seat is Nostell Priory, near Crofton, West Yorkshire. The house was handed over to the National Trust in 1953 but is still the home of the Barons St Oswald.

Barons St Oswald (1885)
Rowland Winn, 1st Baron St Oswald (1820–1893)
Rowland Winn, 2nd Baron St Oswald (1857–1919)
Rowland George Winn, 3rd Baron St Oswald (1893–1957)
Rowland Denys Guy Winn, 4th Baron St Oswald (1916–1984)
Derek Edward Anthony Winn, 5th Baron St Oswald (1919–1999)
Charles Rowland Andrew Winn, 6th Baron St Oswald (b. 1959)

The heir apparent is the present holder's son the Hon. Rowland Charles Sebastian Henry Winn (b. 1986)

See also
Baron Headley

Notes

References

Baronies in the Peerage of the United Kingdom
1885 establishments in the United Kingdom
Noble titles created in 1885
Noble titles created for UK MPs